Church Street School is a historic school building for African-American students located at Thomasville, Davidson County, North Carolina. It was built in 1935–1937, and is a two-story, "T"-shaped, Colonial Revival style brick building.  A two-story auditorium projects from the rear of the main building. Two-story wings built in 1951 flank the original building. A gymnasium was built the same year. Some funding for school construction was provided by the Public Works Administration.

It was added to the National Register of Historic Places in 1990.

References

African-American history of North Carolina
Public Works Administration in North Carolina
School buildings on the National Register of Historic Places in North Carolina
Colonial Revival architecture in North Carolina
School buildings completed in 1937
Buildings and structures in Davidson County, North Carolina
National Register of Historic Places in Davidson County, North Carolina
Thomasville, North Carolina